1,3-Thiazepine is a thiazepine, which is a seven-membered heterocyclic chemical compound containing nitrogen and carbon.

References

Thiazepines